In algebraic geometry, the Zariski tangent space is a construction that defines a tangent space at a point P on an algebraic variety V (and more generally). It does not use differential calculus, being based directly on abstract algebra, and in the most concrete cases just the theory of a system of linear equations.

Motivation 
For example, suppose given a plane curve C defined by a polynomial equation

F(X,Y) = 0

and take P to be the origin (0,0). Erasing terms of higher order than 1 would produce a 'linearised' equation reading

L(X,Y) = 0

in which all terms XaYb have been discarded if a + b > 1.

We have two cases: L may be 0, or it may be the equation of a line. In the first case the (Zariski) tangent space to C at (0,0) is the whole plane, considered as a two-dimensional affine space. In the second case, the tangent space is that line, considered as affine space. (The question of the origin comes up, when we take P as a general point on C; it is better to say 'affine space' and then note that P is a natural origin, rather than insist directly that it is a vector space.)

It is easy to see that over the real field we can obtain L in terms of the first partial derivatives of F. When those both are 0 at P, we have a singular point (double point, cusp or something more complicated). The general definition is that singular points of C are the cases when the tangent space has dimension 2.

Definition 
The cotangent space of a local ring R, with maximal ideal  is defined to be

where 2 is given by the product of ideals. It is a vector space over the residue field k:= R/. Its dual (as a k-vector space) is called tangent space of R.

This definition is a generalization of the above example to higher dimensions: suppose given an affine algebraic variety V and a point v of V. Morally, modding out 2 corresponds to dropping the non-linear terms from the equations defining V inside some affine space, therefore giving a system of linear equations that define the tangent space.

Due to the functoriality of Spec, the natural quotient map  induces a homomorphism  for X=Spec(R), P a point in Y=Spec(R/I). Since morphisms of fields are injective, the surjection of the residue fields induced by g is an isomorphism. Then a morphism k of the cotangent spaces is induced by g, given by

Since this is a surjection, the transpose  is an injection.

(One often defines the tangent and cotangent spaces for a manifold in the analogous manner.)

Analytic functions 
If V is a subvariety of an n-dimensional vector space, defined by an ideal I, then R = Fn / I, where Fn is the ring of smooth/analytic/holomorphic functions on this vector space.  The Zariski tangent space at x is
mn / (I+mn2),
where mn is the maximal ideal consisting of those functions in Fn vanishing at x.

In the planar example above, I = (F(X,Y)), and I+m2 = (L(X,Y))+m2.

Properties 
If R is a Noetherian local ring, the dimension of the tangent space is at least the dimension of R:
dim m/m2 ≧ dim R

R is called regular if equality holds. In a more geometric parlance, when R is the local ring of a variety V at a point v, one also says that v is a regular point. Otherwise it is called a singular point.

The tangent space has an interpretation in terms of K[t]/(t2), the dual numbers for K; in the parlance of schemes, morphisms from Spec K[t]/(t2) to a scheme X over K correspond to a choice of a rational point x ∈ X(k) and an element of the tangent space at x. Therefore, one also talks about tangent vectors. See also: tangent space to a functor.

In general, the dimension of the Zariski tangent space can be extremely large. Define  to be the ring of germs of such functions at the origin. Then R is a local ring, and its maximal ideal m consists of all germs which vanish at the origin. The dimension of the Zariski tangent space  is therefore at least . On the other hand, the ring of germs of smooth functions at a point in an n-manifold has an n-dimensional Zariski cotangent space.

See also 
 Tangent cone
 Jet (mathematics)

Notes

Citations

Sources

External links 
 Zariski tangent space. V.I. Danilov (originator), Encyclopedia of Mathematics.

Algebraic geometry
Differential algebra